The Historie of Travaile Into Virginia Britannia is a 1612 historical book by William Strachey, one of the most prominent primary sources on the earliest English colonization efforts in North America. He was a settler at Jamestown, and wrote extensively of the Powhatan civilization. Because of its critiques of the London Company, it did not receive publication in its own time; delayed until 1849 when the Hakluyt Society finally pressed and released the text. It was also feared to have a negative contrast with John Smith's own book, published in the same year. The subtitle is: "Expressing the Cosmographie and Comodities of the Country, Together with the Manners and Customes of the People".

References

1612 books
Colony of Virginia